Jafarabad (also Romanized as Ja‘farābād; also known as Jū Kārīz) is a village in Zeberkhan Rural District, Zeberkhan District, Nishapur County, Razavi Khorasan Province, Iran. At the 2006 census, its population was 123, in 31 families.

References 

Populated places in Nishapur County